Bouteroue Lake is a freshwater body of the Lac-Ashuapmushuan, Quebec unorganized territory, in the northwestern part of the Regional County Municipality (MRC) Le Domaine-du-Roy, in the administrative region of Saguenay-Lac-Saint-Jean, in the province of Quebec, in Canada. This lake borders the townships of Rohault, Robert, Ducharme and Bouteroue.

Forestry is the main economic activity of the sector, followed by tourism.

The forest road route 167 passes north-east of Nicabau Lake, connecting Chibougamau to Saint-Félicien, Quebec. The Canadian National Railway runs along this road. The northern part of lake Bouteroue is served by the forest road serving the Nemenjiche River.

Lake Bouteroue's surface is usually frozen from early November to mid-May, however, safe ice movement is generally from mid-November to mid-April.

Geography

Toponymy
Formerly, this body of water was designated "Owen Lake".

The toponym "Lac Bouteroue" was made official on December 5, 1968 by the Commission de toponymie du Québec, i.e. at the creation of this commission.

Notes and references

See also 

Lakes of Saguenay–Lac-Saint-Jean
Le Domaine-du-Roy Regional County Municipality